The Prince in Chains (Spanish: El príncipe encadenado, Italian: Il principe dei vichinghi) aka King of the Vikings, is a 1960 Spanish-Italian historical adventure film directed by Luis Lucia.

The film's sets were designed by Sigfrido Burmann.

Cast
In alphabetical order

References

Bibliography 
 Bentley, Bernard. A Companion to Spanish Cinema. Boydell & Brewer, 2008.

External links 
 

1960 films
1960s historical adventure films
Spanish historical adventure films
Italian historical adventure films
1960s Spanish-language films
Films directed by Luis Lucia
Films based on works by Pedro Calderón de la Barca
Films set in the Middle Ages
1960s Spanish films
1960s Italian films